Aleksandar Pavličević (born 21 February 1950) is a Yugoslav former swimmer. He competed in the men's 100 metre butterfly at the 1972 Summer Olympics.

References

1950 births
Living people
Yugoslav male swimmers
Olympic swimmers of Yugoslavia
Swimmers at the 1972 Summer Olympics
Place of birth missing (living people)